Bendy is an American-Canadian media franchise based on the horror indie video game series developed and published by Kindly Beast as "Joey Drew Studios Inc."

Overview

Gameplay 
The Bendy games are set at the fictional studio of Joey Drew Studios, where the player navigates through a first-person perspective and have limited physical actions such as running and jumping. Players are required to complete certain objectives to proceed, which consist of solving certain puzzles by collecting certain objects and of combating enemies that appear through the games by using certain weapons, such as axe, pipe, gun, etc.

Development 
The Bendy franchise was inspired by the BioShock series, as both of them are set in the 20th-century and both of them have an antique style. The idea for the concept of the series  came from theMeatly when he thought about a world that could resemble a cartoon sketch.

Games

Story
Set in retro times, the series is focuses on Joey Drew Studios, a fictional animation studio run by Joey Drew, which was responsible for numerous popular characters such as Bendy and his friends. The plot revolves around the titular Ink Machine, a mysterious machine created by Drew and the Gent Corporation in order to create living cartoons, created from the souls of Drew's employees, and which is responsible for a ground hog loop day realm called the Cycle. Each Game has different protagonists trying to free themselves from the horrors in the ink world and against ink monsters such as the ink demon.

Characters
Bendy, the titular character of the franchise, is a cartoon demon who serves as the mascot for Joey Drew Studios. He manifests in game as the Ink Demon, the Ink Machine's first creation, and a soulless monster which rules over the Cycle, which resets following his death. Other forms of the Ink Demon include a more benevolent cartoon Bendy and a monstrous form called Beast Bendy. The Ink Demon was the main villain of the first game and the prequel, and the overarching antagonist of the second game. Alice Angel is the female star of the Bendy cartoons, who is implied to be Bendy's love interest. The two actresses who voiced the character, Susie Campbell and Allison Pendle, manifest as versions of Alice in the games. Susie manifests as Twisted Alice, a deformed, sadistic Alice who craves perfection, while Allison manifests as Allison Angel, a kindhearted survivor. There is also Boris the Wolf, one of Bendy's friends, who had many clones in the Cycle, all murdered by Twisted Alice. Daniel Lewek, Joey's former apprentice, became a kindhearted Boris named Buddy Boris. Thomas Conner, Allison's husband and an employee of the Gent Corporation, becomes Tom, a clone of Boris with a mechanical arm. Other versions of Boris include Brute Boris, a monstrous version of Buddy Boris after being experimented on by Twisted Alice, and Borkis, a clone of Boris with glowing eyes, who serves as a secret boss in Boris and the Dark Survival.

Other ink creatures include the Butcher Gang, Bendy's archenemies from the cartoons, who appear as recurring enemies in each game. The members include Charley / Piper, the leader of the Butcher Gang who is a primate, Barley / Fisher a human sailor, and Edgar / Striker a spider. Bendy and the Dark Revival adds a female member to the Butcher Gang called Carley / Slicer, a ghost girl. Other enemies includes Searchers and Lost Ones, former employees of Joey Drew Studios that have become trapped in the Cycle.

Each game has a different protagonist. The protagonist of Bendy and the Ink Machine is Henry Stein, an ink replica of Joey's former partner. Buddy Boris serves as the protagonist of Boris and the Dark Survival. And the protagonist of Bendy and the Dark Revival is Audrey Drew, the Ink Machine created daughter of Joey Drew. 

Other human characters include Joey Drew, the creator and CEO of Joey Drew Studios, who indirectly caused the events of the series. Joey dies prior to the events of Bendy and the Dark Revival, but an ink replica of him guides Audrey. Wilson Arch is the main antagonist of Bendy and the Dark Revival. He is the son of Nathan Arch, founder of Archgate Pictures, and has disguised himself as a janitor to take over the Cycle with his creations, the Keepers. Towards the end of the game, Wilson becomes Shipahoy Wilson, a fusion of himself and his cartoon character, Shipahoy Dudley, who was meant to replace the Ink Demon. 

Other humans turned ink monsters include Sammy Lawarence, the former music director of Joey Drew Studios who went insane and started to worship the Ink Demon as a deity. It is implied through audio logs that Sammy had a relationship with Susie Campbell. Norman Polk, the former projectionist at Joey Drew Studios, was transformed into the Projectionist monster. Bertrum Piedmont, a world-renowned theme park designer hired by Joey Drew Studios, becomes a giant head fused with an amusement park ride. 

The Gent Corporation are the presumed overarching antagonists of the series. The company is run by Alan Gray, an unseen character. Gent created the Ink Machine as well as other technology found throughout the Cycle.

Bendy and the Ink Machine (2017–2018) 

Bendy and the Ink Machine is an episodic first-person puzzle action survival horror video game and the first installment of the series. The game consists of five chapters, and developed from February 10, 2017, to October 28, 2018.

Boris and the Dark Survival (2020) 
A prequel to Bendy and the Ink machine was released on February 10, 2020, as part of the original game's third anniversary, on PC and mobile platforms. Players play as Boris the Wolf from an up-top vision as he navigates his way through Joey Drew Studios, running away from Bendy.

Bendy and the Dark Revival (2022) 
Bendy and the Dark Revival is the next game in the series. Bendy and the Dark Revival was released on November 15, 2022, on Steam and will release on Xbox and PlayStation on March 1. The game takes place roughly 10 years after the events of the original game and follows a character named Audrey, an animator who works for Archgate Pictures; the company that took over Joey Drew Studios after its bankruptcy. One night, Audrey is pulled into the Ink Machine by Archgate's corruptive janitor Wilson. Audrey wakes up in the ink world, which Wilson now controls, claiming he killed the Ink Demon and that he knows the purpose of the people trapped there. Upon entering the ink world, Audrey is given special abilities that she can use to protect herself in this strange new world. She also finds a Gent Pipe to use as a weapon against Lost Ones and Searchers, and meets Allison Angel, a character from the original game. At one point, she confronts and defeats a spider-like ink monster.

During the game, Audrey meets an ink replica of Joey Drew, who reveals that the ink world is trapped in a cycle forever repeating itself. Ink Joey reveals that the ink world was created by a vengeful Joey after his business partner Henry Stein left the company, and created an ink replica of Henry (the playable character of Bendy and the Ink Machine) so he could torment him endlessly. However, Joey's ambition changed when he met Allison Pendle, the second voice actress for Alice Angel. Having a change of heart, Joey made Allison Angel for Henry, so she could guide him when things looked dark. With a change of heart, Joey used the Ink Machine to create a living daughter, made out of flesh and ink, who is revealed to be Audrey.

Throughout the game, Audrey meets a cartoon version of Bendy. In Chapter 4, the cartoon Bendy is revealed to be the Ink Demon. Wilson eventually reveals to Audrey that he could not kill the Ink Demon, so he created a device that weakened his power and turned him into a more harmless form that would pose no threat to the ink world. Despite this, the Ink Demon constantly stalks Audrey and speaks to her. Following a battle against Twisted Alice, she reunites with Allison (who kills her evil counterpart once more) and Tom, who agree to help Audrey stop the Ink Demon and they go to find help for her. 

In the finale of Chapter 5, Audrey faces off against Wilson, who requires Audrey's soul to bring his creation, Shipahoy Dudley, to life, so he can finally defeat the Ink Demon and put a more controllable monster in his place. However, Audrey fights back and Wilson becomes trapped in Audrey's place and fuses with Shipahoy Dudley, causing him to become violent and full of vengeance. Audrey uses her powers to kill Wilson, but without Wilson, Shipahoy Dudley becomes a mindless creature and rips Audrey's legs off. Audrey is saved by the Ink Demon, who kills Shipahoy Dudley and drags him into the ink. With nowhere left to go, Audrey merges with the Ink Demon and turns into the monstrous Beast Bendy. Ink Joey gives Audrey the reel of "The End" (which Henry used to kill the Ink Demon, which in turn resets the Cycle) at the cost of his life. Audrey takes control of the body and, with help from Allison, Tom; Porter, an ink humanoid that Audrey met earlier; Big Steve, an ink monster controlled by Tom; and Henry, finds a projector (which is heavily implied to be the head of the Projectionist, an enemy from the first game) and shows the Ink Demon "The End", resetting the Cycle.

At the end, Audrey returns to the real world, now in control of the Cycle, and promises to make it better for her friends inside. Audrey claims that the ink world is starting to leak into the real world, as she looks to her side and sees an in-color cartoon Bendy. The after credits show Gent Corp taking the ink machine and its items to an unknown location to continue with their experiments.

Spin-offs

Bendy in Nightmare Run (2018)
A mobile spin-off, titled Bendy in Nightmare Run, was announced on January 26, 2018, and was released on Android and iOS on August 15, 2018. Developed by Karman Interactive and published by Kindly Beast as Joey Drew Studios Inc., the game introduces the cartoon versions of Bendy, Boris and Alice Angel in an endless running-style game, featuring four levels with a different "boss" cartoon monster, as well as collectible items and power-ups, including bacon soup cans that act as currency to buy abilities and upgrades, and possible future updates.

Animated shorts
Videos for a series of animated shorts based on the fictional works of the Joey Drew Studios company have been released from creator theMeatly's Joey Drew Studios Inc. YouTube channel, with animation done by animator Timethehobo. The first animated short, "Tombstone Picnic", was released as part of the Chapter Three reveal trailer on August 11, 2017. The second short, "Haunted Hijinx", was uploaded on October 31, 2017, to celebrate Halloween. The third short, "Snow Sillies", was uploaded on December 24, 2017, in celebration of the holiday season. A second Christmas short, "Cookie Cookin", was uploaded on December 24, 2018, a year later after the release of "Snow Sillies". A fifth short, "Tasty Trio Troubles", was uploaded on February 10, 2019, in celebration of the game's second anniversary. "Hellfire Fighters", a short from the game, was uploaded on March 5, 2019. A seventh short, Cheap Seats, was uploaded on December 17, 2019. These shorts largely feature Bendy and Boris, with the Butcher Gang and Alice also appearing in the fifth and seventh shorts respectively.

One of Rooster Teeth's channels, ScrewAttack, pitted Bendy against Cuphead, the titular protagonist of the run and gun platformer Cuphead, in an animated fight on their web series, DBX, with Bendy emerging victorious.

Bendy shorts

Crossover with Cuphead

Books

Novels

Bendy and the Ink Machine: Dreams Come to Life 
Bendy and the Ink Machine: Dreams Come to Life is a novel written by Adrienne Kress published by Scholastic on September 3, 2019. The novel centers on Daniel "Buddy" Lewek, a Jewish teenager who is hired by Joey Drew to intern at his studio. He begins to suspect that something is wrong when he encounters the ink. The book serves as a prequel to Bendy and the Ink Machine and Boris and the Dark Survival.

Bendy and the Ink Machine: Sent From Above 
The second novel, titled Sent From Above, was originally scheduled to be released on August 1, 2020, but it was removed from the schedule as Kress focused on another Bendy book, The Illusion of Living. It is yet to be confirmed a release date, but will be published by Scholastic.

Bendy: The Illusion Of Living 
Bendy: The Illusion Of Living is the second novel in the Bendy franchise written by Adrienne Kress. The novel is based on the in-game memoir of the character, Joey Drew, the founder of Joey Drew Studios. The book is told in the first-person by Joey Drew as he explains in detail about his life, his philosophy for creating animations, his techniques and the creation of his animation studio & mascot, Bendy. The book was published by Scholastic on February 2, 2021.

Bendy and the Ink Machine: The Lost Ones 
Bendy and the Ink Machine: The Lost Ones is the 4th novel in the Bendy franchise. This is the fourth Bendy novel to be written by Adrienne Kress and is listed as a sequel to the first novel, "Dreams Come to Life". The novel is set in Atlantic City in 1946. The plot revolves around three new characters named Bill, Constance and Brant. The novel was published by Scholastic and was released on December 7, 2021.

Guides
Joey Drew Studios Employee Handbook is a guide book written by Cala Spinner published by Scholastic on July 30, 2019.

Comics
A compilation book of vintage-style Bendy comic strips, Crack-Up Comic Collection, is written by Vannotes and Mady Giuliani and were published by Scholastic on September 1, 2020.

Cultural impact

Crossovers 
A Halloween crossover mod, Hello Bendy, was released for the game on October 27, 2017, for a limited time, featuring the Hello Neighbor antagonist, who takes the role as Bendy in all previous three chapters and Sammy Lawrence for Chapter 2. The mod's menu features the advertisement of pre-ordering the game Hello Neighbor. The mod expired by the end of October that year.

Co-creator Mike Mood has talked about wanting to do a crossover with Cuphead, which also was popular at around the same time and also uses rubber hose animation.

Upcoming projects

Television adaptation 
On 2020, Derek Kolstad, creator of the John Wick franchise, stated that he has interest in making a television adaptation based on the Bendy and the Ink Machine game.

References

Windows games
Nintendo Switch games
PlayStation 4 games
Xbox One games
Video games adapted into comics
Video games adapted into novels
Video game franchises
Video game franchises introduced in 2017
Works about animation
Disney parodies
Internet memes introduced in 2017
2010s fads and trends
2020s fads and trends